"Alone with You" is the third and final single from Scottish band Texas' second album, Mothers Heaven (1991). It returned the band to the UK Singles Chart top 40 for the first time since 1989, reaching number 32. The song also reached number 28 in France, where it was released in late 1991.

Track listings
UK 7-inch and cassette single
 "Alone with You"
 "Down in Battlefield"

UK CD1
 "Alone with You"
 "Why Believe in You"
 "Everyday Now"
 "I Don't Want a Lover"

UK CD2
 "Alone with You"
 "Can't Get Next to You" 
 "What Goes On" 
 "Sweet Child o' Mine" 
 "Can't Get Next to You" and "What Goes On" were recorded live at Antoines, Austin, Texas, on 23 November 1991. "Sweet Child o' Mine" was recorded live at Wembley Stadium on 26 August 1989.

Charts

References

Texas (band) songs
1991 songs
1992 singles
Mercury Records singles
Songs written by Johnny McElhone
Songs written by Sharleen Spiteri